Milton House is a historic building in Melbourne, Australia.

Location
The building is located at 21–25 on Flinders Lane.

History
It was built in 1901 and designed in the Art Nouveau style by architects Sydney Smith & Ogg. They also worked with architect Robert Joseph Haddon (1866–1929), who suggested the use of red bricks.

As it says on the historical marker, the building was originally used "as a private hospital," particularly to fight tuberculosis.

It is listed on the Victorian Heritage Register.

References

Buildings and structures in Melbourne City Centre
Houses completed in 1901
Heritage-listed buildings in Melbourne
Hospitals established in 1901
1901 establishments in Australia
Art Nouveau architecture in Melbourne